Fort Dodge Stampede is a 1951 Western film produced and directed by Harry Keller and starring Allan Lane. This film is one of 34 'B-movie' westerns filmed between 1947 and 1953 featuring Allan 'Rocky' Lane and his horse Black Jack.

Plot
The Pike gang steal $30,000 from the Adams Bank, but one of them double crosses the rest of the gang and hides the money in Fort Dodge, Nevada. As Fort Dodge is out of his jurisdiction, Deputy Sheriff 'Rocky' Lane (Allan Lane) takes a vacation there and finds that everything is owned by 'Skeeter' Davis (Chubby Johnson), who knows nothing about the hidden money. But the Pike gang is also in town looking for the money. When settlers come to town, Rocky  devises a plan to catch the outlaws and retrieve the money for the Adams Bank.

Cast
Allan Lane as Deputy Sheriff 'Rocky' Lane  
Black Jack as Rocky's horse
Chubby Johnson as 'Skeeter' Davis
Mary Ellen Kay as Natalie Bryan
Roy Barcroft as Henchman Pike Hardin
Trevor Bardette as 'Sparkler' McCann
Bruce Edwards as Jeff Bryan
Wes Hudman as Henchman Butler
William Forrest as W. I. Hutchinson
Chuck Roberson as Henchman Ragan
Rory Mallinson as Sheriff
Jack Ingram as Henchman Cox
Kermit Maynard as Wagon Train Scout

External links

1951 films
Republic Pictures films
1951 Western (genre) films
American black-and-white films
American Western (genre) films
Films directed by Harry Keller
1950s English-language films
1950s American films